Jennifer Lafleur is an American actress. She is known for appearing in the independent films The Do-Deca-Pentathlon (2012), The Pretty One (2013), The Midnight Swim (2014), MAD (2016) and 6 Years (2015). On television, Lafleur has appeared on the HBO series Big Little Lies, Room 104 and Animals., the Showtime series Billions, American Crime on ABC, Married on FX, Chicago Fire on NBC, Workaholics and Review on Comedy Central, Childrens Hospital and Newsreaders on Adult Swim, and Major Crimes on TNT.

Personal life
Lafleur was born in Ware, Massachusetts and grew up in Brookfield. Her father is an emergency room physician, and her mother is a firefighter, paramedic, and commands the local emergency ambulance service. Lafleur worked as an EMT for seven years throughout college and graduate school. She graduated summa cum laude from Westfield State University. She went on to receive her Master of Fine Arts in acting from Brandeis University. She most likely is of French or French-Canadian ancestry.

On April 30, 2016, Lafleur married actor and director Ross Partridge, after dating for ten years.

On May 18, 2019, Jennifer delivered the commencement address at Westfield State University.

Career
Lafleur began her acting career with small appearances in the films Baghead (2008), and Jeff, Who Lives at Home (2011), both of which were written and directed by Jay and Mark Duplass. In 2012, she had a major supporting role in their next film, The Do-Deca-Pentathlon, portraying the role of Stephanie.

In 2013, she co-starred as Marguerite in The Pretty One. In 2014, she had a main role in the indie thriller The Midnight Swim. She starred as Annie, one of three sisters who returns home when their mother goes missing after diving in a lake. She also created and starred in the webseries Wedlock which also stars Mark Duplass and Rob Corddry.

In 2015, Lafleur co-starred in Hannah Fidell's romantic drama 6 Years, in a cast led by Taissa Farmiga and Ben Rosenfield, and starred as Melissa in Ross Partridge's independent drama film Lamb.

Filmography

Film

Television

References

External links

 

21st-century American actresses
American film actresses
American soap opera actresses
Actresses from Massachusetts
Brandeis University alumni
Living people
People from Ware, Massachusetts
People from Brookfield, Massachusetts
Westfield State University alumni
Year of birth missing (living people)